Esther Cheboo (born ) is a retired Kenyan female volleyball player.

She was part of the Kenya women's national volleyball team at the 1998 FIVB Volleyball Women's World Championship in Japan.

References

1968 births
Living people
Kenyan women's volleyball players
Kenyan sportswomen
Place of birth missing (living people)